Frozen in Time is a 2005 album by American death metal band Obituary.

Frozen in Time may also refer to:
 Frozen in Time (novel), a 2009 novel by Ali Sparks
 Frozen in Time: An Epic Story of Survival and a Modern Quest for Lost Heroes of World War II, a 2013 book by Mitchell Zuckoff
 Frozen in Time: The Fate of the Franklin Expedition, a 1987 book by Owen Beattie and John Geiger